Lantern Entertainment, LLC is an American independent film studio. It was formed by Lantern Capital Partners after it acquired the assets of The Weinstein Company (TWC) on July 16, 2018, after the latter company's bankruptcy filing (which was a result of co-founder Harvey Weinstein being convicted of sexual harassment, assault, and rape). Lantern is a separate company unaffiliated with the Weinsteins and purchased the entire assets of the former studio in a bankruptcy auction.

History 
On July 16, 2018, the Dallas-based equity firm Lantern Capital Partners bought the assets of The Weinstein Company (TWC) for $289 million. Lantern Entertainment was formed and assumed the rights to TWC's 277-film library. In November 2018, Lantern acquired full control of three Quentin Tarantino films (Inglourious Basterds, Django Unchained and The Hateful Eight), originally released by The Weinstein Company, for $5.5 million.

In February 2019, Lantern was reported to be reaching a settlement with The Walt Disney Company, regarding several films that Lantern did not acquire (including Scream 4 and The Matador).

On March 13, 2019, Lantern and Gary Barber relaunched Spyglass Media Group, which will host the former TWC library. Italian film distributor Eagle Pictures, cinema chain Cineworld (which owned and operated Regal Cinemas) and later WarnerMedia/AT&T's Warner Bros. were brought in as minority holders. Lantern made a majority investment including its film library to Spyglass. In July 2019, Spyglass settled two major claims, including $11 million for Viacom regarding the TV series Scream (whose last season was delayed until July 2019, three years after the second season finale) and the film Sin City: A Dame to Kill For (which Lantern did not acquire). In March 2020, a federal judge ruled that Spyglass was not responsible for any of TWC's outgoing royalties, and it discontinued making movies and TV shows from now on and it was transferred into Spyglass Media Group and Lionsgate.

Assets

Current 
Motion pictures
 Spyglass Media Group

Television
 Lantern Television

Content libraries 
 The Weinstein Company film library (most of these were sold to Lionsgate through Spyglass Media Group)
 Post-2005 Dimension Films library

Former 
 Radius — dormant; folded into Lantern Entertainment
 Dimension Films — defunct; now as an in-name-only unit subsidiary

Radius 

Radius (stylized as RADiUS; formerly Radius-TWC) is a dormant film label to Lantern Entertainment, formerly to TWC's division, for distribution of multi-platform video-on-demand and theatrical productions. It was launched in 2012, and specialized in niche and independent films rather than those aimed at mainstream audiences. , Radius had released about 35 films, including Bachelorette, Butter, 20 Feet from Stardom, Only God Forgives, Lovelace, All the Boys Love Mandy Lane, Man of Tai Chi, Fed Up, Snowpiercer, Citizenfour, Horns, The Last Five Years, and It Follows.

Filmography

Film

Television

References

External links 
 

 
Film production companies of the United States
Film distributors of the United States
Companies based in Dallas
Mass media companies established in 2018
2018 establishments in Texas
American independent film studios